G. indicus may refer to:

 Gyaritus indicus, a species of longhorn beetle
 Gyps indicus, the Indian vulture, an Old World vulture native to the Indian subcontinent